Gaslit is an American political thriller television limited series based on the first season of the podcast Slow Burn by Leon Neyfakh. It stars Julia Roberts, Sean Penn, Dan Stevens, Betty Gilpin, Shea Whigham, and Darby Camp. It premiered on Starz on April 24, 2022.

Premise
Gaslit begins in early 1972 and follows the story of the Watergate scandal through the lives of several individuals on its periphery. Nixon, for example, is rarely seen, while the main protagonist is Martha Mitchell—known as "The Mouth from the South" due to her propensity for talking to the press, often at inopportune times for her husband, John. He opens the series as Nixon's Attorney General. She is aware that her behavior makes her unpopular with the government and her husband, on one occasion telling the latter "get another wife if you want a silent one". Seen as a liability by both, she eventually blows the whistle on Nixon's knowledge of the activities of his staffer. 

Other perspectives come from the burglary's coordinator, G. Gordon Liddy, who leads a gang of ex-FBI agents and Cuban exiles. He is also presented as a Nazi sympathizer—"an Apocalypse Now-style menace, a sage spouting nonsense who likes to hold his hand over a burning flame"—who presents the White House with a grand plan for the wholesale infiltration of the Democratic Party. John Dean, Junior Counsel, is at first pleased to be chosen by the President himself for his position, but becomes increasingly unnerved at the extent of the administration's involvement in criminality until he realizes he is being set up as a fall guy. His personal life is also complicated by his engagement and subsequent marriage to a political left-wing activist. The Daily Telegraph summarizes Gaslit as focusing "on the Watergate characters who were right at the center of the scandal but who have faded from public memory"; similarly, The Hollywood Reporter identifies the series as refocusing the events of 1972–1975 away from the white men in positions of political power to white wives, a black security guard, and Italian and Hispanic FBI field agents.

Cast

Main
 Julia Roberts as Martha Mitchell
 Sean Penn as John N. Mitchell
 Dan Stevens as John Dean
 Betty Gilpin as Mo Dean
 Shea Whigham as G. Gordon Liddy
 Darby Camp as Marty Mitchell

Recurring
 Allison Tolman as Winzola "Winnie" McLendon
 J.C. Mackenzie as Howard Hunt
 Chris Bauer as James McCord
 Chris Messina as Agent Angelo Lano
 Carlos Valdes as Agent Paul Magallanes
 Hamish Linklater as Jeb Magruder
 John Carroll Lynch as L. Patrick Gray
 Jordi Caballero as Eugenio Martínez
 Oscar Torre as Virgilio Gonzalez
 Jeff Doucette as Senator Sam Ervin
 Patton Oswalt as Charles Colson
 Nat Faxon as H. R. Haldeman
 Martha Kelly as Rose Mary Woods
 Erinn Hayes as Peggy Ebbitt
 Patrick Walker as Frank Wills
 Raphael Sbarge as Charles N. Shaffer
 Keisuke Hoashi as Senator Daniel Inouye
 Anne Dudek as Diana Oweiss
 Chris Conner as John Ehrlichman
 Brian Geraghty as Peter Bailin (based on Steve King)
 Nelson Franklin as Richard A. Moore
 Reed Diamond as Mark Felt
 John Ventimiglia as Judge John Sirica
 Jim Meskimen as Senator Edward Gurney
 Johnny Berchtold as Jay Jennings
 Adam Ray as Ron Ziegler
 Kat Foster as Barbara Walters
 Billy Smith as Ken Ebbitt
 Asha Kamali as Linda
 Aleksandar Filimonović as Zolton

Episodes

Production
Gaslit is a political thriller based on the first season of the Slate podcast Slow Burn. The series from Universal Content Productions was announced in February 2020, with Sam Esmail attached to executive produce and Julia Roberts, Sean Penn, Armie Hammer and Joel Edgerton joining the cast. Edgerton was also set to direct the series along with his brother Nash Edgerton. Hammer would exit the series due to scheduling conflicts in January 2021. In February, the series was picked up by Starz, while both Edgerton brothers also exited the series. Matt Ross joined as the new director. Dan Stevens would be cast to replace Hammer in April, with Betty Gilpin, Darby Camp and Shea Whigham joining in May and Whigham replacing Edgerton.

Filming began that same month in Los Angeles, California. In July 2021, Allison Tolman, J.C. Mackenzie, Chris Bauer, Chris Messina and Hamish Linklater joined the cast in recurring roles. Penn had refused to return to the series until all cast and crew on the production had the COVID-19 vaccine. In September, the studio and Penn reached a compromise where Penn would film his scenes in two weeks with a vaccinated production crew. Fourteen cast members were confirmed for recurring roles in October. On February 2, 2022, the series was given an April 24, 2022 premiere date. In an interview, Pickering said the series was not a "girlboss overcorrect of history" or a "Wikipedia run down" but that their goal was to accurately depict the historical events. "Anyone can go and read a book about this or the Wikipedia entry," Stevens said, "but there are human stories that illustrate the depth."

Reception

Critical response
 Metacritic, which uses a weighted average, assigned a score of 71 out of 100 based on 28 critics, indicating "generally favorable reviews".

Ratings

Accolades

References

External links
 
 

2022 American television series debuts
2022 American television series endings
American political drama television series
American thriller television series
Television shows based on podcasts
Starz original programming
English-language television shows
Television series by Anonymous Content
Television series by Universal Content Productions
Television shows filmed in Los Angeles
Works about the Watergate scandal
Cultural depictions of Richard Nixon
Pat Nixon